Nathan Road is the main thoroughfare in Kowloon, Hong Kong, aligned south–north from Tsim Sha Tsui to Sham Shui Po. It is lined with shops and restaurants and throngs with visitors, and was known in the post–World War II years as the Golden Mile, a name that is now rarely used. It starts on the southern part of Kowloon at its junction with Salisbury Road, a few metres north of Victoria Harbour, and ends at its intersection with Boundary Street in the north. Portions of the Kwun Tong and Tsuen Wan lines (Prince Edward, Mong Kok, Yau Ma Tei, Jordan and Tsim Sha Tsui) run underneath Nathan Road.

History

The first section of the road was completed in 1861. It was the very first road built in Kowloon, after the land was ceded by the Qing dynasty government to the United Kingdom and made part of the crown colony in 1860. The road was originally named Robinson Road, after Sir Hercules Robinson, the 5th Governor of Hong Kong. To avoid confusion with the Robinson Road on Hong Kong Island, the name was changed to Nathan Road in 1909, after Sir Matthew Nathan, the 13th Governor who served between 1904 and 1907.

The road started at Mody Road in Tsim Sha Tsui, ending northward at Austin Road. When Sha Tsui Wan was reclaimed in the late 1800s, Salisbury Road was extended east, and Nathan Road was extended south to meet it. Nathan was extended northward in the 1920s. The section of the road from Gascoigne Road to Argyle Street was originally named Coronation Road (加冕道), in honour of the coronation of King George V in 1911. The road was renamed as part of Nathan Road in 1926, after works joining the road and Nathan Road was completed. The section of Tai Po Road south of Boundary Street was also renamed as part of the road.

The early Nathan Road was largely residential, with colonial-style houses with arched verandahs and covered archways. It was home to the Whitfield Barracks, which later became Kowloon Park. Saint Andrew's Church, the oldest Anglican church in Kowloon, has been located there since its completion in 1906.

In 1996, the Garley Building fire broke out, killing 41 people. In 2008, the Cornwall Court fire broke out, involving more than 200 firefighters, killing 4 people, including 2 fire fighters.

Landmarks

 The Peninsula Hotel (corner of Salisbury Road and the southern end of Nathan Road)
 26 Nathan Road (#26)
 Chungking Mansions (#36–44)
 iSQUARE (#63)
 Kowloon Park
 Park Lane Shopper's Boulevard
 The ONE, at the location of the former Tung Ying Building (#100)
 Kowloon Masjid and Islamic Centre (#105)
 The Mira Hong Kong (#118)
 Miramar Shopping Centre (#132–134)
 Former Kowloon British School (#136). Now houses the Antiquities and Monuments Office
 St Andrew's Church, Kowloon (#138)
 Po On Commercial Building (#198)
 Fourseas Building (#208–212)
 Yau Tsim District Police Headquarters and Tsim Sha Tsui Police Station (#213)
 Shamrock Hotel (#223)
 Garley Building (#233–239, destroyed by fire in 1996)
 Manulife Provident Funds Place (also known as Wing On Kowloon Center, #345)
 Novotel Nathan Road Kowloon Hong Kong (#348)
 Hang Shing Building (#363–373)
 Eaton Hotel Hong Kong (#380)
 Alhambra Building (#383–389)
 Kowloon Central Post Office (#405)
 Chak Fung House (#440–442A)
 Yun Kai Building (#466–472)
 Sunbeam Commercial Building (#469–471)
 Oxford Commercial Building (#494–496)
 Nathan Tower (#518–520)
 Mongkok Building (#546)
 Full Win Commercial Centre (#573)
 Sino Centre (#582–592)
 Hollywood Plaza Mongkok (#610)
 Good Hope Building (#612–618)
 Bank Centre Mall (#636)
 Wu Sang House (#655)
 HSBC Building Mongkok (#673)
 Cornwall Court (#687–689). Site of the 2008 Cornwall Court fire.
 Belgian Bank Building (#721–725)
 Golden Plaza (#745–747)
 Newish Mansion (#763–767)
 Union Park Centre (#771–775)

Public transport
Five stations of the Mass Transit Railway (MTR) are built directly underneath Nathan Road. These stations are, from north to south:

 Prince Edward station in Mong Kok, at the intersection between Nathan Road and Prince Edward Road West
 Mong Kok station (or Argyle station) in Mong Kok, at the intersection between Nathan Road and Argyle Street
 Yau Ma Tei station (or Waterloo station) in Yau Ma Tei, at the intersection between Nathan Road and Waterloo Road
 Jordan station in Jordan, at the intersection between Nathan Road and Jordan Road
 Tsim Sha Tsui station in Tsim Sha Tsui, at the intersection between Nathan Road and Carnarvon Road

The road is heavily trafficked by numerous bus routes.

Gallery

See also
 Yau Tsim Mong District
 List of streets and roads in Hong Kong
 List of leading shopping streets and districts by city

References

External links

Photo Tour of Nathan Road
More pictures of Nathan Road.
Google Maps of Nathan Road

Roads in Kowloon
Tsim Sha Tsui
Yau Ma Tei
Mong Kok
Shopping districts and streets in Hong Kong